The Crigler Mound Group is an important archaeological site in the northeastern part of the U.S. state of Missouri.  Located in the Salt River valley near Mark Twain Lake, these burial mounds have been named a historic site.

In the 1960s, the Crigler mounds were seemingly the largest and best-preserved group within what was soon projected to become the Joanna Reservoir. The mounds are in a straight line with an orientation of 320°, or approximately northwest. The top and center portion is almost flat and slightly depressed. Mound No. 7 was approximately 32 feet in diameter and 2 feet high, but the construction of a roadway necessitated the grading of most of the mound; only about 25% of the original mound survives. No bones or artifacts were found when the grading was performed, and no other excavations have been conducted in living memory, if ever.

On May 21, 1969, the Crigler Mound Group was listed on the National Register of Historic Places because of its archaeological value.  The site was one of the first two Monroe County sites listed on the Register, along with the Mark Twain Birthplace State Historic Site in Florida, which gained the designation on the same day.

References

Mounds in Missouri
Archaeological sites on the National Register of Historic Places in Missouri
Buildings and structures in Monroe County, Missouri
National Register of Historic Places in Monroe County, Missouri